Kaylie Ann Collins (born May 17, 1998) is an American professional soccer player who plays as a goalkeeper for Orlando Pride of the NWSL.

Early life 
Born in Clayton, California, Collins was a four-year starting varsity goalkeeper and captain at Carondelet High School and was named to the TopDrawerSoccer.com high school All-American first team in 2016. She played club soccer with Diablo FC and Mustang SC, reaching the National Championship semifinals and Surf Cup final in 2014, and was a Region IV Olympic Development Program member.

USC Trojans 
Collins played four seasons of college soccer at the University of Southern California between 2016 and 2021 while also studying as a communications major before completing a master's degree in applied psychology. After redshirting as a true freshman behind Sammy Jo Prudhomme in 2016, Collins made 19 appearances for the USC Trojans in her redshirt freshman year in 2017 and was named to the Pac-12 All-Freshman Team. Also in 2017, Collins was made the team's culture committee leader in charge of creating an enjoyable and welcoming team atmosphere. Head coach Keidane McAlpine singled out Collins for her energy and amiability. As a sophomore in 2018, Collins started all 22 of USC's games, conceding 11 goals and posting an 86.1% save rate to earn Pac-12 Goalkeeper of the Year, All-Pac-12 first team, All-Region first team, United Soccer Coaches All-America second team and TopDrawerSoccer.com Best XI second team honors. Her ten solo-shutouts tied her for the fourth best single-season total in program history. After missing 11 games early in the season with an injury, Collins made 11 appearances in 2019 as the Trojans reached the NCAA College Cup quarterfinals for only the third time. She elected to delay her pro career and return in 2021 to contest her senior season despite being drafted in January following the NCAA's offer of a waiver in light of the COVID-19 pandemic that meant draftees were able to remain in college to contest the rescheduled 2020 college spring season. Collins played in 13 of the 14 games in her final season at USC.

In the 2018 and 2019 offseasons, Collins joined WPSL sides SoCal FC and FC Golden State.

Club career

Orlando Pride 
On January 13, 2021, Collins was selected in the fourth round (34th overall) of the 2021 NWSL Draft by Orlando Pride, the second of two goalkeepers drafted in 2021 behind Sydney Schneider. After finishing out the delayed college spring season with USC, Collins signed a short-term national team replacement contract with Orlando on June 4 to cover for Erin McLeod who was on international duty for Canada but did not make an appearance as a rookie. Ahead of the 2022 season, Collins signed a two-year contract with the club. She made her professional debut on April 23, 2022. With McLeod injured, Collins sat behind offseason recruit Anna Moorhouse for three games before starting the final match of the 2022 NWSL Challenge Cup with Orlando already guaranteed to finish last in their group. She made four saves, only allowing one goal on a penalty kick as Orlando drew 1–1 with Gotham FC at Red Bull Arena.

International career 
Collins was selected for the United States at under-14 and under-15 levels.

Career statistics

College summary

Club summary

Honors

Individual 
Pac-12 Conference Goalkeeper of the Year: 2017

References

External links 
 USC Trojans profile
 

1998 births
Living people
People from Clayton, California
Sportspeople from the San Francisco Bay Area
Soccer players from California
American women's soccer players
Women's association football goalkeepers
USC Trojans women's soccer players
Orlando Pride draft picks
Orlando Pride players
Women's Premier Soccer League players
National Women's Soccer League players